Bilal Hamdi (born 1 May 1991) is an Algerian professional footballer who played for Cypriot First Division club Doxa Katokopias as a winger.

Club career
Born in Nedroma, Algeria, Hamdi joined the youth ranks of RC Lens in 2004. In the summer of 2012, he terminated his contract with the club and signed a two year contract with Ligue 2 side Stade Lavallois. On July 27, 2012, he made his debut for Laval as a starter in the first week of the 2012–13 Ligue 2 season against Châteauroux.

On 12 July 2018, Hamdi signed a one-year contract with Zira FK.

International career
In October 2009, Hamdi was called up to the Algeria national under-20 football team for the first time for a week-long training camp in Staouéli. In December, he was part of the under-20 team that finished second at the 2009 UNAF U-20 Tournament in Libya.

In 2011, he was called up to the Algeria national under-23 football team a number of times but did not make the final cut for the 2011 CAF U-23 Championship.

References

External links
 
 
 

1991 births
Living people
Algeria youth international footballers
Algeria under-23 international footballers
Algerian footballers
Algerian expatriates in France
Algerian expatriates in Cyprus
Expatriate footballers in Azerbaijan
Ligue 2 players
Championnat National players
Cypriot First Division players
Azerbaijan Premier League players
People from Nedroma
RC Lens players
Stade Lavallois players
Clermont Foot players
Stade Brestois 29 players
CS Sedan Ardennes players
Alki Oroklini players
Zira FK players
Sabail FK players
French sportspeople of Algerian descent
Association football wingers
Olympiakos Nicosia players